Per-Olof Arvidsson (18 December 1864 – 30 August 1947) was a Swedish shooter who competed at the 1908 and 1912 Summer Olympics in eight events in total. He won a silver medal in the team free rifle 1908 and a gold in 1912, in the 100 m team running deer, single shots.

References

External links

profile

1864 births
1947 deaths
Swedish male sport shooters
Running target shooters
ISSF rifle shooters
Olympic shooters of Sweden
Shooters at the 1908 Summer Olympics
Shooters at the 1912 Summer Olympics
Olympic gold medalists for Sweden
Olympic silver medalists for Sweden
Olympic medalists in shooting
Medalists at the 1908 Summer Olympics
Medalists at the 1912 Summer Olympics
19th-century Swedish people
20th-century Swedish people